A Modern Salome is a lost 1920 American silent drama film directed by Leonce Perret and starring Hope Hampton. It was produced and distributed by Metro Pictures. The film is based on the 1891 Oscar Wilde play Salome.

A display advert of the time states: "Her fancy swept her back through the ages, and she was dancing before king Herod for the head of John the Baptist. Yet she was a modern woman, a hot-house product of Twentieth Century Society."

Cast
Hope Hampton as Virginia Hastings
Sidney Mason as Robert Monti
Percy Standing as James Vandam
Arthur Donaldson as Walter Greene
Wyndham Standing as Harry Torrence
Agnes Ayres as Helen Torrence

References

External links

Silent American drama films
1920s American films
1920 drama films
1920 films
American silent feature films
Lost American films
1920 lost films
Lost drama films
Films based on Salome (play)
Films directed by Léonce Perret

American black-and-white films
Metro Pictures films